Symbian may refer to:

 Symbian, mobile operating system and integrated software platform developed by the Symbian Foundation, originally a proprietary operating system developed by Symbian Ltd.
 Symbian Ltd., software development and licensing company that produced Symbian OS between its foundation in 1998 and acquisition by Nokia in 2008
 Symbian Foundation, non-profit foundation created by Nokia to develop the integrated Symbian platform

See also
 Accredited Symbian Developer, accreditation program for software developers developing for the Symbian operating system
 Sybian, autoerotic mechanical device
 Symbion, genus of aquatic animals